Kumar Gaon is a village in Tezpur Block, Sonitpur district of Assam state in India. Kumar Gaon population in 2022 is estimated to be 1,247. According to 2011 census population is 1,091

Demographics 
Kumar gaon has a population of 1113, among them 573 are male and 540 are female as per the 2011 Population Census. The population of children aged 0–6 is 96, or 8.63% of the total. The average sex ratio is 942, lower than the Assam state average of 958. The child sex ratio for Kumar gaon is 920, lower than Assam's average of 962.

Climate 
Kumar Gaon has a moderate to warm climate in summer and in February is slightly chillier, with the temperature during the period around 18 to 23-degree C.

See also 
Jamugurihat
Tezpur

References

Cities and towns in Sonitpur district
Sonitpur district